This is a list of National Collegiate Athletic Association (NCAA) schools in the United States and Canada that play lacrosse as a varsity sport at the Division II level. In the 2023 NCAA lacrosse season, there are 77 men's and 121 women's Division II lacrosse programs.

Dates of addition or dropping of lacrosse, or changes in conference affiliation, reflect the time at which the change takes effect. Because NCAA lacrosse for both men and women is a spring sport, this will not match the first overall season of competition for new teams, or the first season of competition in a new conference. For teams departing Division II, the departure will take place after the completion of that year's lacrosse season.

Conference affiliations are current for the upcoming 2023 NCAA lacrosse season.

NCAA Division II men's lacrosse programs

Reclassifying institution in yellow; institution that has announced a future departure from Division II lacrosse highlighted in pink.

NCAA Division II women's lacrosse programs

Reclassifying institution in yellow; institution that has announced a future departure from Division II lacrosse highlighted in pink.

Future Division II lacrosse programs

See also

NCAA Division II Men's Lacrosse Championship
NCAA Division II Women's Lacrosse Championship
List of NCAA Division II institutions
List of NCAA Division II football programs
List of NCAA Division II men's soccer programs
List of NCAA Division II wrestling programs
List of NCAA Division I lacrosse programs
NAIA lacrosse

References

External links

NCAA Division II Men's Lacrosse Sponsorship
NCAA Division II Women's Lacrosse Sponsorship
NCAA Division II Men's Lacrosse Home
NCAA Division II Women's Lacrosse Home

NCAA Division II
Lacrosse
NCAA lacrosse
Lacrosse, Division II